Wei Wang may refer to:

Chinese royalty
In Chinese history, Wei Wang (King/Prince of Wei, or King/Prince Wei) may refer to:

Warring States period
King Wei of Qi (died 320 BC)
King Wei of Chu (died 329 BC)
Monarchs of Wei (state)
King Hui of Wei (r. 370–319 BC)
King Xiang of Wei (r. 319–296 BC)
King Zhao of Wei (r. 296–277 BC)
King Anxi of Wei (r. 277–243 BC)
King Jingmin of Wei (r. 243–228 BC)

Han dynasty
Cao Cao (155–220), late Han dynasty warlord, known as King/Prince of Wei (魏王) from 216 to 220
Cao Pi (187–226), briefly known as King/Prince of Wei (魏王) before he usurped the Han throne

Tang dynasty
Li Tai (618–652), known as Prince of Wei (衛王) from 621 to 628 and Prince of Wei (魏王) from 636 to 643
Wu Chengsi (died 698), Wu Zetian's nephew, known as Prince of Wei (魏王) after 690
Li Chongjun (died 707), known as Prince of Wei (衛王) after 705
Han Jian (Weibo warlord) (died 883), known as Prince of Wei Commandery (魏郡王)
Zhu Wen (852–912), known as Prince of Wei (魏王) from 905 to 907 before he usurped the Tang throne

Others
Li Jiji (died 926), Later Tang prince, known as Prince of Wei (魏王) after 925
Liu Chang (Southern Han) (942–980), Southern Han emperor, known as Prince of Wei (衛王) before he became the emperor in 958
Wanyan Yongji (died 1213), Jin dynasty emperor, known as Prince of Wei (衛王) after 1197 and before he became the emperor in 1208
Zhao Bing (1272–1279), Song dynasty emperor, known as Prince of Wei (衛王) after 1276 and before he became the emperor in 1278

Other people
Wei Wang (table tennis) (born 1961), Chinese-American Olympic table tennis player

See also
Wei (disambiguation)
Wang Wei (disambiguation)